Los Chicos (also known as Los Chicos de Puerto Rico) were a Puerto Rican boy band that was popular in Puerto Rico, South America and in Central America during the early to mid 1980s, which was created to rival Menudo's success.

The band was created by Eric Laboy in 1978, with the name Encuentro. Due to a political campaign slogan, the name was changed to Los Chicos, which translates to The Kids by Mr. Carlos Alfonso Ramirez who took ownership and managed the boy band. They enjoyed huge success during the early 1980s, under the new management particularly in Puerto Rico South America and Central America. Mr. Alfonso added the following individuals to his management team: Mr. Angelo Medina (Road Manager), Leonor Constanzo (Choreographer), Grace Fontecha (Personal Image Enhancement), Julio Farinacci-Fontecha "Master-Jay" (Audio-Visuals & Computer Technologies) and "Jacquene" (Security/Driver). A movie (Conexión Caribe) was filmed and a TV show hosted weekly on Puerto Rico's WAPA-TV. Many songs, including Puerto Rico son Los Chicos, Vuelve,  Ave María, Para Amar and Mamma Mia sung by Jorge Lopez a.k.a. Giro Lopez or Giro became radio favorites, and memorabilia items like posters were mass-produced. Los Chicos became national sponsors for Malta Corona and Mahones Savage (Savage Jeans).

In October 1983, three of the original members, Rey, Migue and Chayanne, quit the group, alleging poor working conditions.
Chayanne became a solo artist and released his first album in 1984. Carlos Alfonso took over the new group with original member Hector Antonio "Tony" Ocasio and three new group members (Tico Santana, Jorge Lopez a.k.a. Giro Lopez or Giro, Alejandro "Casito" Farinacci Fontecha, and Alejandro Rodriguez). However, this version did not have as much of the acceptance from the public as the first group of boys, and finally the band was dissolved. While it never achieved Menudo's level of popularity, it gave them a run for their money in Puerto Rico and Latin American countries, especially Guatemala, Costa Rica, El Salvador, Nicaragua and Panamá. During a televised concert in the Dominican Republic, Los Chicos had to abandon the stage because of fans reaching it. In 1990 Tony Ocasio joined the United States Army and was sent to Iraq where fought in Operation Desert Storm.

After break-up
Los Chicos' most popular members were Chayanne (now an international super-star), Jorge Lopez a.k.a. Giro or Giro Lopez, who was signed to Sony Music and has had a long-term relationship with the label as a Salsa artist with over 10 albums, many gold records and a Grammy Nomination. Giro is still performing and is still well known as a Salsa artist and has released new albums with other labels; in 2010 he created Giro Productions and with the help of Chino Rodriguez now his manager and record label, has released the latest Album "Todavia Hay Amor" on OMG records and Giro Productions, Migue Santa (who became a helicopter pilot), Tony Ocasio and Rey Díaz. Currently Rey is working as a Sales Executive in a prominent firm at Puerto Rico. Future Menudo member Sergio Blass was a member of Los Chicos for a short period of time, he was the only singer to be a member of both Los Chicos and Menudo. Sergio Blass was also a member of arguably the third most popular boy band in Puerto Rico during the early eighties, Concepto Juvenil, making him the only person to be in all three bands.

In the aftermath of the success achieved by six former Menudos in a comeback nicknamed El Reencuentro, some former members of Los Chicos spoke about making a comeback too. They had one concert, as 'Los Chicos-El Retorno". Chayanne did not participate in it.

In August 2012, three former members of Los Chicos released a tell all book named "Los Chicos ~ Mil Recuerdos Sus Historias" written by Joana Acevedo Ocasio with the help of Tony Ocasio (Original lead singer of Los Chicos) and original group members Rey Diaz and Migue Santa. The book recounts their experiences as members of the famous boy band, how they reached stardom and lost it all to mismanagement.

Former member Jose Miguel "Migue" Santa died on March 19, 2019 of respiratory failure.

Los Chicos Mil Recuerdos Sus Historias

Members
Chayanne (Elmer Figueroa Arce)
Migue (Jose Miguel Santa, 1967-2019)
Rey (Reynaldo Diaz)
Tony (Hector Antonio Ocasio Cedeno)
Alex (Alejandro Jose Rodriguez)
Tico (Fredrick Santana Contreras)
Giro (Jorge Manuel Lopez Martinez)
Caccito (Alejandro Farinacci Fontecha) 
Sergio (Sergio Gonzalez Ojeda), later known as Sergio Blass.

Discography
1980  - Para Amar [Original Members: Chayanne, Ray Diaz, Migue Santa and Tony Ocasio]
1982 - Puerto Rico [Original Members]
1983 - Viva el Amor [Original Members]
1983 - Bailando [Original Members]
1984 - Los Chicos en Conexion Caribe [Tony, + Tico, Alex, and Alejandro]
1985 - Ases de Puerto Rico [Tico, Alex, Alejandro, + Jorge]
1985 - Los Chicos en Portugues [Same members as above]
1986 - Con Fuego y Pasion [Tico, Alejandro, Jorge, + Tony]

See also
 Chayanne es mi Nombre
 Giro Lopez or Jorge Manuel Lopez
 H2O

References

External links
Los Chicos Mil Recuerdos Sus Historias (The Book)
Primer Hora Article on book
Joana Acevedo Ocasio - CoAuthor on Los Chicos Mil Recuerdos Sus Historias

Puerto Rican boy bands
Puerto Rican musical groups
1978 establishments in the United States
Musical groups established in 1978